D.A.R. State Forest can mean:

 D.A.R. State Forest (Massachusetts)
 D.A.R. State Forest (Minnesota)